The Egypt Revival Party was an Egyptian political party made up of former members of the NDP. The party was superseded by the Union Party, which was officially approved in September 2011.

References

2011 disestablishments in Egypt
Political parties disestablished in 2011
Political parties with year of establishment missing
Defunct political parties in Egypt